The Veterans Memorial Coliseum is a 3,500-seat multi-purpose arena, in Marion, Ohio. It was built in 1949.

It was home to the Marion Blue Racers indoor football team of X-League Indoor Football.

The arena was formerly home to the Marion Barons, a minor league professional ice hockey team during the 1953-54 International Hockey League season. The Toledo Mercurys played part of the 1955–56 season at the arena, operating as the "Toledo-Marion Mercurys." The most recent former tenant was the Marion Mayhem, which folded in 2010, after 5 years of participating in the CIFL (known as the Great Lakes Indoor Football League during its inaugural season).

The Ohio Junior High wrestling championships were held at the arena.

References

Indoor arenas in Ohio
Buildings and structures in Marion, Ohio
Indoor ice hockey venues in Ohio
Wrestling venues in Ohio
Tourist attractions in Marion County, Ohio
Sports venues completed in 1950
1950 establishments in Ohio